Convoy OA 178 (Outbound Atlantic) was an Atlantic convoy of 14 ocean-going ships and local coasters, comprising 53 ships. The convoy sailed from Southend-on-Sea in the Thames Estuary on 3 July 1940 via the English Channel and was then dissolved on 6 July 1940 as its surviving ships joined convoys to transatlantic destinations. No support was forthcoming from RAF Fighter Command and in the aftermath, the Prime Minister, Winston Churchill, was critical of the lack of protection afforded to the convoy. Henceforth OA convoys were routed northabout Scotland but local Coastal East and Coastal West coal convoys continued and suffered more attacks from the combination of Stukas and E-Boats.

Background

Luftwaffe anti-shipping operations

 attacks on shipping were made much easier by the capture of bases in France and the Low Countries; in the North Sea, the Grimsby fishing fleet had been attacked twice in June. Air attacks increased and in July, ship losses off the east coast exceeded those by naval mines. Attacks on minesweepers, escort vessels and anti-invasion patrols rapidly increased and was made worse by a lack of light anti-aircraft guns and the concentration of the air defence effort in the south-east of England, against a possible invasion. The Admiralty reserved the right for ships to fire on aircraft on an apparently attacking course because it had been found that a high volume of prompt, accurate fire could reduce the accuracy of bombing and sometimes shoot down the attacker. Hurried training and lack of experience in aircraft recognition among navy crews led to many RAF aircraft being taken for hostile and fired on, even when escorts for the ships. While demanding close escort, the Admiralty required ships to engage unidentified aircraft within , a practice the RAF considered irresponsible. More training in aircraft recognition and pilots not flying towards to ships on tracks similar to bombing runs were obvious remedies and with experience, navy gunners made fewer mistakes.

OA convoys
OA convoys (Outbound Atlantic) from the Thames Estuary were a convoy series which was convoyed to the Western Approaches whence they joined convoys to their destinations. OA convoys incorporated coasters from the Thames to Southampton, Poole, Plymouth, Fowey and Falmouth along the south coast. The convoys continued to sail along the south coast after the Fall of France on 22 June 1940 and on 1 July twenty ships of Convoy OA 177G sailed from Southend-on-Sea. Next morning German aircraft attacked SS Baron Ruthven, two men being killed by machine-gun fire. Later on the 10,000 Gross register ton (GRT) Aeneas was bombed and abandoned. Most of the coasters left the convoy for local ports before another ten ocean-going ships joined the convoy from Plymouth and Falmouth and eighteen ships joined when it merged with an OB convoy from Liverpool on 2 July, parts of the convoy then turned away for Bilbao, Lisbon and Casablanca; only two ships remained when the convoy reached the Atlantic dispersal point.

Prelude

The convoy of 14 ocean-going  merchant ships and local colliers departed on 3 July, over-flown by German aircraft.heading inland. The convoy passed the Straits of Dover during the night of 3/4 July and by dawn, German aircraft again began to pass by. The captain of Hartlepool, W. J. Rogerson, saw the Isle of Wight in the distance and

 

By the afternoon of 4 July, OA 178 was south of Portland Bill.

4 July

Portland harbour

At  33 Junkers Ju 87  dive bombers of III./StG51 attacked Portland, escorted by Bf 110 heavy fighters (destroyers) of V./()  and two  of Bf 109s from 1./LG1. The auxiliary anti-aircraft ship  (Captain H. P. Wilson Rtd) had been commissioned on 6 June 1940 and carried four twin high-angle 4-inch turrets, two quadruple 2-pounder pom-pom guns and several Vickers .50 machine guns. Foylebank had been based at the harbour for anti-aircraft defence since 9 June. When the Stukas bombed, they dived at angles of up to 90° towards the stern of the ship; at  the dive-bomber eased to 45°, the pilot aligning the gun sight on the stern of the ship and opening fire, the bullets moving forwards to the stem of the ship. The pilot released the bombs as he saw the machine-gun fire pass beyond the bows and hit the water. The pilot had also set the altimeter to the local altitude above mean sea level and a siren blared to warn him to bomb and begin to pull out of the dive. As the Stuka recovered from its dive, the rear-gunner opened fire to keep heads down; the raid took four minutes.

As gunners were running along the decks of Foylebank to reach their action stations, many where hit by bullets or caught by bomb blasts. Two sailors ran for their action station at X gun and a bomb blew one of them across the canteen, wounded and dead lying everywhere. The two sailors headed aft along the port side of the ship towards X gun and a bomb fell down the funnel which blew open the side of the ship facing the docks and they had to turn around. At the rear of the ship the sailors passed through the sick bay for a ladder to the deck but a  bomb hit the sick bay, killing everyone there and the second sailor, lower on the ladder. The survivor got on deck to find that his gun had been hit and the crew dead or wounded. The sailor saw other crewmembers firing a pom-pom, matting around it on fire. An officer ordered him forward as the ship was going to be abandoned and he jumped , damaging his back, although he was unaware of this for several hours. At the pom-pom guns on the starboard side a pile of bodies blocked the way and he had to clamber through them. A petty officer called out that "Mantle's still firing and when he's finished we'll have to get him down".

Acting leading seaman Jack Mantle had been severely wounded in the left leg by a bomb explosion but continued to operate his pom-pom gun, despite it being damaged, hitting a Stuka, which also hit him with machine-gun fire. Mantle was helped away from the gun as the ship was about to be abandoned. The Stukas dropped 104  and  bombs, many of which hit the ship and others near-missed. Some of the gunners on Foylebank managed to fire sixty shells from Y turret.  Civilians had sailed their craft over to Foylebank and received the survivors as they slid down ropes from the fo'c'sle, taking the men to Boscawen, where sixty men were found to have been killed, many more later dying of wounds, including Mantle. The German fighters circled overhead but no RAF fighters appeared, the only Royal Air Force (RAF) aircraft in the area being a Fairey Battle bomber from RAF Warmwell on a training sortie near Chesil Beach. When the pilot saw the raid, he dived for home at full speed. Two Stukas of 7./StG51 were shot down by ground fire, one into the Channel off Portland, the crew being killed and the other crew rescued off the Cotentin Peninsula; a Bf 109 crashed on landing at Théville near Cherbourg. The tug  was also sunk and the steamers City of Melbourne, East Wales and MV William Wilberforce were damaged by bombs in Portland Harbour.

Off Portland
The attack lasted for about two hours, Clarkia engaging the Stukas with its 4-inch gun and four machine-guns. The chief officer of Deucalion wrote later that the sky seemed full of aircraft which hit the ship with nine bombs and began to sink. The captain and the carpenter were seriously wounded by machine-gun fire and as soon as a lull occurred, the crew abandoned ship. The gunner on Dallas City fired at the Stukas as they began to pull out of their dives, their machine-gun fire hitting the ship around him. Three bombs hit Dallas City, one through the skylight to the engine room, one down the funnel and one into number 3 hold, two crew being wounded. Flimstone, already damaged, tried to avoid Dallas City by increasing speed and putting the helm hard to starboard but was hit on the port side by Dallas City, which smashed a lifeboat. It took Flimstone fifteen minutes to manoeuvre free and set course for Portland. (The crew was rescued about three hours later by Antonio).

Flimstone reached Portland Harbour and the rest of the convoy was reduced to a disorganised condition. The convoy commodore, R. P. Galer, ordered the remnants of the convoy to run for the shelter of the Portland Harbour defences but these had been attacked in the morning. When OA 178 came into sight of Portland, three merchant ships in the harbour had already been damaged and the confined space of the harbour would have been a death-trap for the forty ships left in the convoy and it was turned away. No RAF Fighter Command aircraft had appeared to protect the convoy and during the evening,  S 19, S 20, S 24 and S 26 (E-Boats to the British) of 1. (commanded by  Birnbacher in S 24) sailed.

Night 4/5 July

The  fired its other torpedo at the starboard side as the lifeboat was being rowed clear; the torpedo passed underneath the lifeboat before hitting the ship and the lifeboat capsized, sixteen men being drowned; survivors were rescued by destroyer . Two crewmen were killed and the ship was abandoned but did not sink and was later towed into port. Hartlepool was torpedoed by S 26 and abandoned, south, south-west of Portland, apparently in a sinking condition, the survivors being rescued by destroyer ; the ship was later beached at Weymouth.

5–6 July
On 5 July, OA 178 was reinforced by the destroyer  until 6 July when the surviving ships of OA 178 dispersed in the Southwest Approaches and joined oceanic convoys.

Aftermath

Analysis
In 2008, Nick Hewitt wrote that hitherto, 3,404 ships had sailed the Channel with eight losses, which was some explanation for British complacency. In 2013, the historian Andy Saunders wrote that the convoy was too far from the English coast for fighters easily to have protected it and when the Stukas attacked. If Fighter Command squadrons had been scrambled from RAF bases they would have not arrived before the raid was over. Saunders called the losses inflicted on OA 178 a British failure, which showed the Germans that the Royal Navy and the RAF were incapable of protecting Channel convoys. The British prime minister, Winston Churchill, issued an Action this Day memo to the Admiralty inquiring about the measures to defend convoys along the south coast, particularly the matter of air cover. The severity of the losses to OA 178 was such that henceforth OA convoys were assembled at Methil in Fife and sailed northabout Scotland to avoid the English Channel.

Casualties
Temporary Lieutenant Commander (E) B. Nish RNR, Temporary Lieutenant (E) J. R. Bissett RNR, Temporary Sub/Lieutenant (E) J. W. McMullan RNR, Lieutenant W. G. P. Brigstocke RNVR, Probationary Temporary Surgeon Lt E. I. Smith, MB, ChB RNVR and one hundred and seventy one ratings (total 176) were killed on Foylebank; thirteen officers and one hundred and forty-four ratings (total 157) were rescued. Sixteen men of Elmcrest were killed and one man was killed on Kolga, a total of 193 men were killed. One Stuka crew was shot down and killed by antiaircraft fire from HMS Foylebank during the attack on Portland Harbour.

Convoy OA 178

Escorts

Ship losses in Portland Harbour

Notes

Footnotes

References

Further reading
 

Aerial operations and battles of World War II
Convoy
OA178